St. Benedict's Church or St. Benedict's Catholic Church or variations may refer to:

Denmark
St. Bendt's Church, Ringsted

Germany
St. Benedict's Church, Munich

Switzerland
St Benedict's Chapel, Sumvitg

United Kingdom
Church of St Benedict, Ardwick, Manchester
Church of St Mary and St Benedict, Buckland Brewer, Devon
St Benedict's Church, Bordesley, West Midlands
St Benedict's Church, Glastonbury, Somerset
St Benedict's Church, Haltham-on-Bain, Lincolnshire
St Benedict's Church, Lincoln, Lincolnshire
St Benedict's Church, Norwich, Norfolk
St Benedict's Church, Paddlesworth, Kent
St Benedict's Church, Warrington, Cheshire
St Bene't's Church, Cambridge
St Benet's Abbey, Norfolk

United States
St. Benedict's Church (Stamford, Connecticut)
St. Benedict's Catholic Church (Honaunau, Hawaii), listed on the National Register of Historic Places on the island of Hawaii
St. Benedict Cathedral (Evansville, Indiana)
St. Benedict's Church (Bendena, Kansas)
St. Benedict's Convent and College Historic District, St. Joseph, Minnesota
St. Benedict's Catholic Church (Nebraska City, Nebraska)
Saint Benedict Joseph Labre Parish, Richmond Hill, New York
St. Benedict Catholic Church (Greensboro, North Carolina)
Church of St. Benedict the Moor (Pittsburgh), Pennsylvania
St. Benedict's Monastery, Colorado
St. Benedict's Abbey, Atchison, Kansas
St. Benedict Abbey (Massachusetts)

See also
St. Benedict's (disambiguation)
Church of St. Benedict the Moor (disambiguation)